Below is a list of Major League Baseball no-hitters, enumerating every no-hitter pitched in Major League Baseball history. In addition, all no-hitters that were broken up in extra innings or were in shortened games are listed, although they are not currently considered official no-hitters. (Prior to 1991, a performance in which no hits were surrendered through nine innings or in a shortened game was considered an official no-hit game.) The names of those pitchers who threw a perfect game no-hitter are italicized. For combined no-hitters by two or more pitchers on the same team, each is listed with his number of innings pitched. Games which were part of a doubleheader are noted as either the first game or second game.

Through November 2, 2022, there have been 318 no-hitters officially recognized by Major League Baseball (MLB); the first 43 in the pre-modern era (before the formation of the American League in 1901) and the balance in the modern era. Three other games are also noted; one in 1875 by Joe Borden that is accepted as a no-hitter but not recognized by MLB (as MLB does not accept the National Association as a major league), one in 1876 by Borden that is disputed and not recognized by MLB, and one in 1901 by Pete Dowling that is also disputed and not recognized by MLB. The first no-hitter officially recognized by MLB was pitched by George Bradley on July 15, 1876, during the first season of play in the National League. The most recent major league no-hitter was thrown by Cristian Javier, Bryan Abreu, Rafael Montero, and Ryan Pressly of the Houston Astros against the Philadelphia Phillies during Game 4 of the World Series on November 2, 2022.

Background

An official no-hit game occurs in Major League Baseball (MLB) when a pitcher (or pitchers) allows no hits during the entire course of a game, which consists of at least nine innings thrown by the pitcher(s). By definition, a perfect game is also a no-hitter, as no batters reach base (thus there are no hits allowed). In a no-hit game, a batter may still reach base via a walk, an error, a fielder's choice, an intentional walk, a hit by pitch, a passed ball or wild pitch on strike three, or catcher's interference. Also, due to these methods of reaching base, it is possible for a team to score runs without getting any hits.

While the vast majority of no-hitters are shutouts, no-hit teams have managed to score runs in their respective games 25 times. Seven times a team has been no-hit and still won the game: two notable victories occurred when the Cincinnati Reds defeated the Houston Colt .45s (now called the Houston Astros) 1–0 on April 23, 1964, even though they were no-hit by Houston starter Ken Johnson, and the Detroit Tigers defeated the Baltimore Orioles 2–1 on April 30, 1967, even though they were no-hit by Baltimore starter Steve Barber and reliever Stu Miller. In another five games, the winning team won despite gaining no hits through eight innings (not needing to play the bottom half of the ninth inning), but these are near no-hitters under the 1991 rule that nine no-hit innings must be completed in order for a no-hitter to be credited.

The pitcher who holds the record for the shortest time between no-hitters is Johnny Vander Meer, the only pitcher in MLB history to throw no-hitters in consecutive starts, while playing for the Cincinnati Reds in 1938. Besides Vander Meer, Allie Reynolds (in 1951), Virgil Trucks (in 1952), Nolan Ryan (in 1973), and Max Scherzer (in 2015) are the only other major leaguers to throw two no-hitters in the same regular season. Jim Maloney technically threw two no-hitters in the 1965 season, but his first one ended after he allowed a home run in the top of the 11th inning. According to the rules interpretation of the time, this was considered a no-hitter. Later that season, Maloney once again took a no-hitter into extra innings, but this time he managed to preserve the no-hitter after the Reds scored in the top half of the tenth, becoming the first pitcher to throw a complete game extra inning no-hitter since Fred Toney in 1917.  Roy Halladay threw two no-hitters in 2010: a perfect game during the regular season and a no-hitter in the 2010 National League Division Series. He is the only major leaguer to have thrown no-hitters in regular season and postseason play.

Ryan holds the record for most no-hitters in a career, with seven.  Sandy Koufax is second on the list with four no-hitters.

The first black pitcher to toss a no-hitter was Sam Jones who did it for the Chicago Cubs in 1955. The first Latin pitcher to throw one was San Francisco Giant Juan Marichal in 1963. The first Asian pitcher to throw one was Los Angeles Dodger Hideo Nomo in 1996.

The most recent MLB season completed without a no-hitter was 2005.

Regulation no-hitters

Key

No-hitters

No-hitters by team

Current teams

Source: 

Italics: Multiple pitchers used for combined no-hitter

Bold: Perfect Game

Defunct teams

Near no-hitters
Regulation games in which a pitcher or staff pitches less than nine full innings, or in which a hit is allowed in extra innings, are not recognized by MLB as no-hitters. However, before the rules were tightened in 1991, such games were recognized as official no-hitters.

Regulation no-hit losses ending in the middle of the ninth

Since the bottom of the ninth inning is not played if the team batting last already has a lead, the pitcher(s) of the team batting first can complete a full game without allowing a hit, but not be credited with an official no-hitter. The winning team may not need to bat in the bottom of the ninth due to runs scored by walks, errors, or anything else not involving hits, in which case the losing team's pitcher(s) will not be credited with an official no-hitter, because they pitched less than nine innings. This has happened only five times in major-league history. 

Such games were recognized as no-hitters before 1991; however, MLB no longer recognizes such games, past or present, as no-hitters. While in modern baseball the home team always bats last, the visiting team sometimes batted last in the early days of professional baseball.

Players' League
June 21, 1890 – Silver King, Chicago Pirates 0 Brooklyn Ward's Wonders 1
 Brooklyn's run scored on an error, sacrifice bunt, and fielder's choice in the seventh inning. Note that Chicago, the home team, opted to bat first in this game, as was allowed at the time; thus, Brooklyn did not bat in the bottom of the ninth.

National League
May 15, 2022 – Hunter Greene (7⅓ IP) and Art Warren (⅔ IP), Cincinnati Reds 0 Pittsburgh Pirates 1
 Pirates' run scored on three walks (two given up by Greene) and a fielder's choice in the eighth inning.

American League
July 1, 1990 – Andy Hawkins, New York Yankees 0 Chicago White Sox 4
 White Sox' four runs scored on an error, stolen base, two walks, and two additional errors in the eighth inning.
April 12, 1992 – Matt Young, Boston Red Sox 1 Cleveland Indians 2
 Indians' first run scored in the first inning on a walk, two stolen bases, and an error; second run scored in the third inning on two walks, a fielder's choice, stolen base, and another fielder's choice.

Interleague play
 June 28, 2008 – Jered Weaver (6 IP) and José Arredondo (2 IP), Los Angeles Angels of Anaheim 0 Los Angeles Dodgers 1
 Dodgers' run scored on an error, stolen base, and sacrifice fly in the fifth inning.

Shortened games
Under certain circumstances, if a game cannot continue because of the weather, darkness, or any other reason, but at least five innings have been completed, the result can stand as an officially completed game. No-hitters pitched under such circumstances were recognized before 1991, but are no longer recognized by MLB as official no-hitters. In many instances, these games were shortened by rain, by darkness (in the era before lights), or due to timing constraints when teams needed to travel on regularly scheduled trains. Some games were scheduled for less than nine innings as part of a doubleheader, decided "by agreement" between managers prior to the start of the game (to avoid darkness or in consideration of travel schedules), or by league rule (2020-21 MLB rules because of pandemic restrictions).

Names listed in bold signify the pitcher was pitching a perfect game at the time the game was ended; such games are not recognized as official perfect games.

National League
October 1, 1884 (6 innings) – Charlie Getzien, Detroit Wolverines 1 Philadelphia Phillies 0
 Game called due to rain.
October 7, 1885 (first game; 5 innings) – Dupee Shaw, Providence Grays 4 Buffalo Bisons 0
 Both games of the doubleheader were scheduled for five innings.
June 21, 1888 (6 innings) – George Van Haltren, Chicago White Stockings 1 Pittsburgh Alleghenys 0
 Game called due to rain.
September 27, 1888 (7 innings) – Ed Crane, New York Giants 3 Washington Nationals 0
 Game called due to darkness.
October 15, 1892 (second game; 5 innings) – Jack Stivetts, Boston Braves 4 Washington Senators 0
 Game called "by agreement".
September 23, 1893 (second game; 7 innings) – Elton Chamberlain, Cincinnati Reds 6 Boston Beaneaters 0
 Game called due to darkness.
June 2, 1894 (6 innings) – Ed Stein, Brooklyn Grooms 1 Chicago White Stockings 0
 Game called due to rain.
September 14, 1903 (second game; 5 innings) – Red Ames, New York Giants 5 St. Louis Cardinals 0
 Game called due to darkness; major league debut for Ames.
August 24, 1906 (second game; 7 innings) – Jake Weimer, Cincinnati Reds 1 Brooklyn Superbas 0
 Game called "by agreement".
September 24, 1906 (second game; 7 innings) – Stoney McGlynn, St. Louis Cardinals 1 Brooklyn Superbas 1
 Game called due to darkness; first game of the doubleheader went 11 innings; Brooklyn run scored on a walk, stolen base, and sacrifice fly in the first inning.
September 26, 1906 (second game; 6 innings) – Lefty Leifield, Pittsburgh Pirates 8 Philadelphia Phillies 0
 Game called due to darkness.
August 11, 1907 (second game; 7 innings) – Ed Karger, St. Louis Cardinals 4 Boston Doves 0
 Game called "by agreement".
August 23, 1907 (second game; 5 innings) – Howie Camnitz, Pittsburgh Pirates 1 New York Giants 0
 Game called "by agreement"; first game of the doubleheader went 10 innings.
August 6, 1908 (first game; 6 innings) – Johnny Lush, St. Louis Cardinals 2 Brooklyn Superbas 0
 Game called due to rain; second game of the doubleheader postponed.
July 31, 1910 (second game; 7 innings) – King Cole, Chicago Cubs 4 St. Louis Cardinals 0
 Game called so teams could catch trains (both teams next played in New York City).
August 27, 1937 (first game; 8 innings) – Fred Frankhouse, Brooklyn Dodgers 5 Cincinnati Reds 0
 Game called due to rain; second game of the doubleheader canceled.
June 22, 1944 (second game; 5 innings) – Jim Tobin, Boston Braves 7 Philadelphia Phillies 0
 Game called due to darkness.
June 12, 1959 (5 innings) – Mike McCormick, San Francisco Giants 3 Philadelphia Phillies 0
 Game called due to rain; McCormick allowed a single in the sixth inning, but as the game was called before that inning was completed, the game officially ended after five innings.
September 26, 1959 (7 innings) – Sam Jones, San Francisco Giants 4 St. Louis Cardinals 0
 Game called due to rain.
April 21, 1984 (second game; 5 innings) – David Palmer, Montreal Expos 4 St. Louis Cardinals 0
 Game called due to rain.
September 24, 1988 (5 innings) – Pascual Pérez, Montreal Expos 1 Philadelphia Phillies 0
 Game called due to rain.
April 25, 2021 (second game; 7 innings) – Madison Bumgarner, Arizona Diamondbacks 7 Atlanta Braves 0
 During the pandemic-shortened 2020 season where teams played 60 games, doubleheaders were scheduled for seven innings each for player safety reasons. The rule was retained for 2021.

American League
August 15, 1905 (5 innings) – Rube Waddell, Philadelphia Athletics 2 St. Louis Browns 0
 Game called due to rain.
May 26, 1907 (5 innings) – Ed Walsh, Chicago White Sox 8 New York Highlanders 1
 Game called due to rain; New York's run scored on two walks and two wild pitches in the first inning.
October 5, 1907 (second game; 5 innings) – Rube Vickers, Philadelphia Athletics 4 Washington Senators 0
 Game called due to darkness.
August 20, 1912 (second game; 6 innings) – Carl Cashion, Washington Senators 2 Cleveland Naps 0
 Game called so Naps could catch an express train to Boston.
August 25, 1924 (first game; 7 innings) – Walter Johnson, Washington Senators 2 St. Louis Browns 0
 Game called due to rain; second game of the doubleheader postponed.
August 5, 1940 (second game; 6 innings) – John Whitehead, St. Louis Browns 4 Detroit Tigers 0
 Game called due to rain.
August 6, 1967 (5 innings) – Dean Chance, Minnesota Twins 2 Boston Red Sox 0
 Game called due to rain.
July 12, 1990 (6 innings) – Mélido Pérez, Chicago White Sox 8 New York Yankees 0
 Game called due to rain.
October 1, 2006 (5 innings) – Devern Hansack, Boston Red Sox 9 Baltimore Orioles 0
 Game called due to rain.
July 7, 2021 (7 innings) – Collin McHugh (2.0 IP), Josh Fleming (2.2 IP), Diego Castillo (0.1 IP), Matt Wisler (1.0 IP), and Pete Fairbanks (1.0 IP), Tampa Bay Rays 4, Cleveland Indians 0
Second game of doubleheader with 2020-21 MLB pandemic player safety rule (see above) shortening doubleheaders to seven innings each game.

American Association

May 6, 1884 (6 innings) – Larry McKeon, Indianapolis Hoosiers 0 Cincinnati Red Stockings 0
July 29, 1889 (second game; 7 innings) – Matt Kilroy, Baltimore Orioles 0 St. Louis Browns 0
September 23, 1890 (7 innings) – George Nicol, St. Louis Browns 21 Philadelphia Athletics 2
October 12, 1890 (8 innings) – Hank Gastright, Columbus Solons 6 Toledo Maumees 0

Union Association
August 21, 1884 (8 innings) – Charlie Geggus, Washington Nationals 12 Wilmington Quicksteps 1
October 5, 1884 (5 innings) – Charlie Sweeney (2 inn.) and Henry Boyle (3 inn.), St. Louis Maroons 0 St. Paul Saints 1

Nine-inning no-hitters broken up in extra innings
MLB previously recognized no-hitters when the only hits allowed occurred in extra innings, until the rules were tightened in 1991. Names listed in bold signify the pitcher was pitching a perfect game through nine innings.

National League
 June 11, 1904 (12 innings) – Bob Wicker, Chicago Cubs 1 New York Giants 0
 Wicker (winning pitcher) surrendered single with one out in 10th; only hit allowed.
 August 1, 1906 (13 innings) – Harry McIntire, Brooklyn Superbas 0 Pittsburgh Pirates 1
 McIntire (losing pitcher) surrendered single with two out in 11th; allowed three more hits.
 April 15, 1909 (13 innings; Opening Day) – Red Ames, New York Giants 0 Brooklyn Superbas 3
 Ames (losing pitcher) surrendered single with one out in 10th; allowed six more hits.
 May 2, 1917 (10 innings) – Hippo Vaughn, Chicago Cubs 0 Cincinnati Reds 1
 Vaughn (losing pitcher) surrendered single with one out in 10th; allowed one more hit; known as "Double No-Hitter" prior to MLB rule change since the opposing pitcher threw 10-inning no-hitter—see entry in main list for Fred Toney.
 May 26, 1956 (11 innings) – Johnny Klippstein (7 inn.), Hersh Freeman (1 inn.) and Joe Black (3 inn.), Cincinnati Reds 1 Milwaukee Braves 2
 Black (losing pitcher) surrendered double with two out in 10th; allowed two more hits.
 May 26, 1959 (13 innings) – Harvey Haddix, Pittsburgh Pirates 0 Milwaukee Braves 1
 Haddix (losing pitcher) pitched 12 perfect innings; first base-runner was lead-off hitter in 13th, who reached on an error; followed by sacrifice bunt, intentional walk, and game-ending hit (ruled a one-run double rather than a three-run home run due to a base-running mistake).
 June 14, 1965 (11 innings) – Jim Maloney, Cincinnati Reds 0 New York Mets 1
 Maloney (losing pitcher) surrendered lead-off home run in 11th; allowed one more hit.
 July 26, 1991 (10 innings) – Mark Gardner (9 inn.) and Jeff Fassero (0 inn.), Montreal Expos 0 Los Angeles Dodgers 1
 Gardner (losing pitcher) surrendered leadoff single in 10th and allowed one more hit before being replaced; Fassero also allowed one hit.
 June 3, 1995 (10 innings) – Pedro Martínez (9 inn.) and Mel Rojas (1 inn.), Montreal Expos 1 San Diego Padres 0
 Martinez (winning pitcher) pitched 9 perfect innings; first San Diego base-runner was from lead-off double surrendered by Martínez in 10th; Rojas relieved him and retired the next three batters, earning a save.
 August 23, 2017 (10 innings) – Rich Hill, Los Angeles Dodgers 0 Pittsburgh Pirates 1
 Hill (losing pitcher) threw 9 no-hit innings and was perfect into the 9th before first base-runner reached on error; surrendered walk-off home run leading off the 10th inning. This is the only time on record that an extra-innings walk-off home run has broken up a no-hitter.

American League
 May 9, 1901 (10 innings) – Earl Moore, Cleveland Blues 2 Chicago White Sox 4
 Moore (losing pitcher) surrendered lead-off single in 10th; allowed one more hit.
 August 30, 1910 (second game; 11 innings) – Tom Hughes, New York Highlanders 0 Cleveland Naps 5
 Hughes (losing pitcher) surrendered single with one out in 10th; allowed six more hits.
 May 14, 1914 (10 innings) – Jim Scott, Chicago White Sox 0 Washington Senators 1
 Scott (losing pitcher) surrendered lead-off single in 10th; allowed one more hit.
 September 18, 1934 (10 innings) – Bobo Newsom, St. Louis Browns 1 Boston Red Sox 2
 Newsom (losing pitcher) surrendered single with two out in 10th; only hit allowed.
 April 23, 2022 (10 innings) – J. P. Feyereisen (2.0 IP), Javy Guerra (0.2 IP), Jeffrey Springs (2.0 IP), Jason Adam (1.1 IP), Ryan Thompson (1.0 IP), Andrew Kittredge (2.0 IP), and Matt Wisler (1.0 IP), Tampa Bay Rays 3 Boston Red Sox 2
Wisler (winning pitcher) surrendered leadoff triple in the 10th; allowed one more hit.

Teams with only a single no-hitter

These active teams have only pitched one no-hitter in their franchise history.

Colorado Rockies

San Diego Padres

Tampa Bay Rays

Toronto Blue Jays

Notes

References

External links

List at ESPN.com (omits Federal League no-hitters)
List at MLB.com (omits all defunct leagues)
List at Retrosheet (includes 1875 National Association no-hitter)

Baseball pitching
Baseball accomplishments
 
Major League Baseball lists
Major League Baseball statistics